Shigeharu (written: , ,  or ) is a masculine Japanese given name. Notable people with the name include:

, Japanese water polo player
, Japanese journalist
, Japanese jazz musician
, Japanese writer and politician
, Japanese anime director and producer
, Japanese samurai
, Japanese footballer
, Japanese video game producer

Japanese masculine given names